Isnardo Enrike "Junior" Faro (born 15 July 1978) is a weightlifter who competed at two Summer Olympics for Aruba.

Career
Aged 18 years old Faro went to Atlanta, United States to compete in the 1996 Summer Olympics, he entered the middleweight division and he finished 21st out of the 24 starters.
Eight years later he competed at the 2004 Summer Olympics held in Athens, Greece, this time he was competing in the middle-heavyweight division, this time he finished 19th out of the 25 lifters that started the event.

References

External links
 

1978 births
Living people
Aruban male weightlifters
Olympic weightlifters of Aruba
Weightlifters at the 1996 Summer Olympics
Weightlifters at the 2004 Summer Olympics
Pan American Games competitors for Aruba
Weightlifters at the 1999 Pan American Games